Lee Richard Adams (born August 14, 1924) is an American lyricist best known for his musical theatre collaboration with Charles Strouse.

Biography
Born in Mansfield, Ohio, Adams is the son of Dr. Leopold Adams, originally of Stamford, Connecticut and Florence Ellis (originally Elishack) Adams, originally of Racine, Wisconsin. His family is Jewish. He is a graduate of Mansfield Senior High School. He received his Bachelor of Arts degree from Ohio State University and a Master's from Columbia University. While attending Ohio State University he was a brother of the Nu chapter of the Zeta Beta Tau fraternity. He worked as a journalist for newspaper and magazines. He met Charles Strouse in 1949 and they initially wrote for summer-time revues.

Adams won Tony Awards in 1961 for Bye Bye Birdie, the first Broadway musical he wrote with Strouse, and in 1970 for Applause and was nominated for a Tony Award in 1965 for Golden Boy. In addition, he wrote the lyrics for All American, It's a Bird...It's a Plane...It's Superman, Bring Back Birdie, and A Broadway Musical, and the book and lyrics for Ain't Broadway Grand. Additionally, Strouse and Adams co-wrote "Those Were the Days", the opening theme to the TV situation comedy All in the Family. Adams was inducted into the Songwriters Hall of Fame in 1989.

Adams and his wife, Dr. Kelly Wood Adams, have lived in Briarcliff Manor, New York since 2007. He has two daughters and three grandchildren.

Non-musical writing
In addition to his work with lyrics, Adams "had a lifelong fascination with words," which led to his being an editor for the Sunday newspaper magazine supplement This Week and a member of the staff of Pageant magazine.

Works
 A Pound in Your Pocket (1958)
 Bye Bye Birdie (1960)
 All American (1962)
 Golden Boy (1964)
 It's a Bird...It's a Plane...It's Superman (1966)
 Applause (1970)
 I and Albert (1972)
 Bring Back Birdie (1980)
 A Broadway Musical (1982), contributed the song Dancing Aint Broadway Grand!'' (1993)

References

Sources

External links
 
 

1924 births
Living people
20th-century American dramatists and playwrights
United States Army personnel of World War II
American lyricists
American musical theatre lyricists
Broadway composers and lyricists
Columbia University Graduate School of Journalism alumni
Ohio State University alumni
People from Mansfield, Ohio
People from Briarcliff Manor, New York
Primetime Emmy Award winners
Songwriters from Ohio
Jewish American songwriters
Tony Award winners
United States Army soldiers
21st-century American Jews